NA-32 Peshawar-V is a constituency for the National Assembly of Pakistan.

Area
During the delimitation of 2018, NA-31 (Peshawar-V) acquired areas from two former constituencies namely NA-1 (Peshawar-I), and NA-3 (Peshawar-III) with most coming from NA-1 (Peshawar-I), the areas of Peshawar which are part of this constituency are listed below alongside the former constituency name from which they were acquired:

Areas acquired from NA-1 Peshawar-I
Dalazak Road
Haji Camp
Afghan Colony
Faqeerabad
Zaryab Colony
Gulbahar
Sikandar Town
Sikandar Pura
New Rampura Gate
Sabz Pir Road
T.B. Hospital
Ganj Bazar
Mohallah Jataan
Chowk Yadgar
Shah Qabool
Ramdas
Beri Bagh
Murshid Abad
Khan Mast Colony

Areas acquired from NA-3 Peshawar-III
Bashir Abad
Coca-Cola Factory Charsadda Road

Members of Parliament

1970–1977: NW-1 Peshawar-I

1977–2002: NA-1 Peshawar-I

2002–2018: NA-1 Peshawar-I

2018-2022: NA-31 Peshawar-V

2002 general election
General Elections were held on 10 October 2002. Shabir Ahmad of Muttahida Majlis-e-Amal won this seat with 37,179 votes.

All Candidates receiving over 1,000 votes are listed here.

 

A total of 1,552 votes were rejected.

2008 general election
General Elections were held on 18 February 2008. Haji Ghulam Ahmad Bilour of the Awami National Party won this seat with 44,210 votes.

All candidates receiving over 1,000 votes are listed here.

A total of 629 votes were rejected.

2013 general election
General Elections were held on 11 May 2013. Imran Khan of Pakistan Tehreek-e-Insaf won this seat with 90,500 votes.

All candidates receiving over 1,000 votes are listed here.

 

 

 

A total of 2,103 votes were rejected.

2013 by-election

The elected member, Imran Khan (leader of PTI), won three separate seats in the General Election, and he chose to keep NA-56. This resulted in him vacating this seat and triggering a by-election, which took place on 22 August 2013. Alhaj Ghulam of the Awami National Party won this seat with 59,456 votes.

All candidates receiving over 1000 votes are listed here.

2018 general election 

General elections were held on 25 July 2018.

2022 by-election 
A by-election was held on 16 October 2022 due to the resignation of Shaukat Ali, the previous MNA from this seat.

†JI previously contested as part of MMA. JUI(F), which also previously contested as part of MMA, did not contest this election.

2023 by-election 
A by-election will be held on 30 April 2023 due to the vacation of this seat by Imran Khan, who won it in the 2022 by-election.

See also
NA-31 Peshawar-IV
NA-33 Nowshera-I

References 

31
31